The NGC 4631 Group is a poorly defined group of galaxies, about 25 million light-years from Earth in the Coma Berenices and Canes Venatici constellations.

The NGC 4631 Group is one of many that lie within the Virgo Supercluster.

Members

spiral galaxy NGC 4631 (Whale Galaxy), brightest galaxy in the group 
interacting galaxies NGC 4656 and NGC 4657 (Hockey Stick Galaxies)
dwarf elliptical galaxy NGC 4627, which is a companion of NGC 4631, is also by default a member of the group, although it is not listed in most catalogs

Aside from these four galaxies, however, the determination of group membership is quite variable. The group lies in a relatively crowded part of the sky near the Virgo Cluster, so exact determination of the group membership is extremely difficult. Some studies have estimated that the NGC 4631 Group contains as few as five galaxies, while others place the estimate as high as 27. Additionally, it is unclear as to whether the galaxies near NGC 4631 and NGC 4656/NGC4657 form one large group or two smaller groups.

See also
Virgo Cluster

References

External links
The Whale and the Hockey Stick Astronomy Picture of the Day of 2009 August 21

 
Galaxy clusters
Coma Berenices
Canes Venatici
Virgo Supercluster